Runton is a civil parish in the English county of Norfolk consisting of the villages of East Runton and West Runton.
For the purposes of local government, it falls within the district of North Norfolk.

The name 'Runton' means either, 'Runa's farm/settlement' or 'Runi's farm/settlement'.

Governance
Runton falls in the electoral ward called The Runtons. This ward stretches south to Aylmerton and had a total population at the 2011 census of 2,125.

Notes 

Populated coastal places in Norfolk
Civil parishes in Norfolk
North Norfolk